Mis tres amores (English title:My three loves) is a Mexican telenovela by Televisa produced by Ernesto Alonso and directed by Antulio Jiménez Pons.

Cast 
Nati Mistral as Raquel
Narciso Busquets as Sergio Montalvo
Magda Guzmán as Consuelo
Anita Blanch as Maria Mercedes
Octavio Galindo as Cesar
Dunia Saldívar as Clara
Fernando Borges as Alex
Olivia Michel as Adriana
Enrique Novi as Lalo
Armando Arriola as Don Fernando
Lilia Aragón as Arlette
Enrique Beraza as Ariel
Manolo García as Mauricio
Julio Lucena as Flavio
Cristina Moreno as Leticia
Juan Peláez as Uribe

References 

Mexican telenovelas
1971 telenovelas
Televisa telenovelas
Spanish-language telenovelas
1971 Mexican television series debuts
1971 Mexican television series endings